U.S. Deaths Near 100,000, An Incalculable Loss was the front-page article of The New York Times on May 24, 2020; the Sunday of the Memorial Day weekend. Its subheader read "They were not simply names on a list. They were us." It contained one thousand obituaries of individuals from across the United States who had died from COVID-19 during the pandemic, as the U.S. death toll reached 100,000.

Background
The article was intended to convey the vastness and variety of the tragedies resulting from the pandemic by personalizing them, countering data fatigue from constant reporting on the pandemic. Assistant graphics editor Simone Landon lead a team of researchers in searching obituaries that listed COVID-19 as the cause of death and extracting names and key personal details.

The list was assembled by researcher Alain Delaquérière through various online sources for obituaries and death notices. A team of editors read them and gleaned phrases that depicted the uniqueness of each life lost. Clinton Cargill, assistant editor on the National desk, co-directed the editing process with Landon. Other key figures include Matt Ruby, deputy editor of Digital News Design; Annie Daniel, a software engineer; and the graphics editors Jonathan Huang, Richard Harris and Lazaro Gamio. Andrew Sondern, an art director, did the print design.

Reception
An image of the front page was tweeted by the Times the Saturday before publication; it had 61,000 retweets and more than 116,000 likes within hours. This tweet was later deleted and replaced with an image of the late edition after one obituary was linked to a homicide victim. Many noted that the front page resembled those of newspapers in the late 1800s or early 1900s due to its lack of large headers or photos.

A number of publications again highlighted those that matched their target demographic: KNXV-TV the eight from Arizona, Nola.com the 20 from Louisiana, Boston.com the 80 from Massachusetts, KOCO-TV the three Oklahomans, Philippine Daily Inquirer the two Filipinos, The National Herald the twelve Greek-Americans.

Princeton University Library made it part of its Graphic Arts Collection.

Its publication was followed by the first week of the George Floyd protests. This inspired the art director Adrianne Benzion and freelance copywriter Jessica McEwan duplicated the cover with 350 names of Black individuals who died following an interaction with the police since 2000. Instead of a short eulogy the status of the victims’ case is stated, a large share of which reads “pending investigation.”

The cover design was ranked 19th in Ad Ages "30 Best Creative Brand Moves of 2020".

Legacy
As the death toll continued the mount, the status of 100,000 deaths as being incalculable was referenced by journalists in order to express how hard a multitude of that figure was to put into frame or how callous later headlines by the Times were in comparison.

Notable deaths
Among the obituaries there were a number of notable deaths:

There were also several that had a significant link to a notable person or institution:
 Peter Bainum, doctoral advisor to aerospace engineer Aprille Ericsson-Jackson
 Bob Barnum, descendant of P. T. Barnum
 Stephen J. Chamberlin Jr., son of WWII general Stephen J. Chamberlin Sr.
 Robert F. Brady Jr., brother of senator Michael Brady
 Julie Butler, mother of writer Zora Howard
 Dante Dennis Flagello, son of opera singer Ezio Flagello
 Theresa Elloie, mother-in-law to rapper Mia X
 Jimmy Glenn, boxing coach of Floyd Patterson, Michael Spinks, Jameel McCline, Aaron Davis and Bobby Cassidy
 Bobby Hebert Sr., father of American football player Bobby Hebert Jr.
 Donald Reed Herring, brother of senator Elizabeth Warren
 Estelle Kestenbaum, former secretary of judge Edwin Stern
 Carole and Barry Kaye, benefactors of the  Florida Atlantic University College of Business
 Peter Laker, father of journalist Barbara Laker
 Artemis Nazarian, benefactor of the AGBU Manoogian-Demirdjian School
 Sheena Miles, mother of politician Tom Miles
 Marguerite Peyser, widow of politician Peter A. Peyser
 Lloyd Cornelius Porter, brother of artist Gregory Porter
 Robert C. Samuels, son of writer Charles Samuels
 Bernard David Seckler, doctoral student of mathematician Joseph Keller
 Ruth E. Shinn, sister of theologian Roger L. Shinn
 Jaimala Singh, descendant of the poet Vir Singh
 Bettie London Traxler, mother of jurist William Byrd Traxler Jr.
 John C. West Jr., son of former South Carolina governor John C. West Sr.

References

External links
 U.S. deaths near 100,000, an incalculable loss

COVID-19 pandemic in the United States
Works originally published in The New York Times
Responses to the COVID-19 pandemic in 2020
Works about the COVID-19 pandemic
Newspaper articles